Short Creek is a stream in Platte County in the U.S. state of Missouri. It is a tributary of Bean Lake.

Short Creek was so named on account of its relatively short length.

See also
List of rivers of Missouri

References

Rivers of Platte County, Missouri
Rivers of Missouri